CEMEXPO (Centro de Exposiciones y Convenciones Mitad del Mundo) is an international convention center located at Manuel Córdova Galarza freeway km. 9. Quito, Ecuador.

History
It was inaugurated in September 1999 and has a surface area of 85,253 square meters.

Events
 Miss Universe 2004
 Miss Ecuador 2008
 Miss Ecuador 2010
 Campus Party Ecuador 2015

References

External links

Convention centers
Event venues established in 1999
Buildings and structures completed in 1999